Pape Mamadou Mbodj (born 12 March 1993) is a Senegalese football defender who plays for Ordabasy.

Club career
Pape Mamadou Mbodj was born in Dakar, Senegal. He was playing with football club Dakar Sacré-Cœur until the 2014. While playing for Dakar Sacré-Cœur, he was selected to be part of the Senegalese U-20 squad at the 2013 Jeux de la Francophonie.

For season 2014-15 he joined Red Star Belgrade, but because of many players on his position on the field, he has loaned to Napredak Kruševac. He made his Jelen SuperLiga debut for Napredak Kruševac on 4 October 2014 in away match against Spartak Subotica - the game ended with a draw result 0:0. He was substituted in for Predrag Lazić in the injury time of that match.

From 2016 season was member of FK Žalgiris Vilnius. After 2018 season he left Lithuanian club.

On 8 December 2018, Mbodj signed for Neftçi PFK on a 2.5-year contract. On 7 June 2021, Mbodj extended his contract with Neftçi until 31 May 2023. On 19 December 2022, Mbodj left Neftçi by mutual consent having scored 9 goals in 94 games for the club.

On 24 February 2023, Kazakhstan Premier League club Ordabasy announced the signing of Mbodj.

International career
Mbodj played in the Senegal U-20 team at the 2013 African U-20 Championship qualification.  In April 2013 he was part of the first call of Aliou Cisse since becoming the new coach of the Senegalese U-23 team.

Honours

Club
Žalgiris
A Lyga: 2016
Lithuanian Cup: 2015–16, 2016
Lithuanian Supercup: 2016, 2017

References

External links
 
 
 Mamadou Mbodj at sofoot.com
 

1993 births
Living people
Footballers from Dakar
Association football defenders
Senegalese footballers
Senegalese expatriate footballers
Senegalese expatriate sportspeople in Serbia
Expatriate footballers in Serbia
Red Star Belgrade footballers
FK Napredak Kruševac players
Serbian SuperLiga players
Senegalese expatriate sportspeople in Lithuania
Expatriate footballers in Lithuania
FK Žalgiris players
A Lyga players
Azerbaijan Premier League players
Neftçi PFK players